Tina Hunter (born January 19, 1985) is a science fiction, fantasy and horror author as well as a blogger.

In 2009, Hunter had her first two short stories published in the "Seven Deadly Sins: Flash Fiction Challenge #1" anthology and two more stories were published in the "Creatures of the Night: Flash Fiction Challenge #2" anthology, both published by Absolute XPress. Another story was picked up for publication in "The Red Book: Chinese Whisperings" collaborative anthology, published by eMergent Press.

In 2010, Hunter published another short story in "The Yin Book: Chinese Whisperings" collaborative anthology, published by eMergent Press. There are rumours that Tina Hunter is also Tina Moreau, publisher and managing editor of Tyche Books Ltd  but this has yet to be confirmed.

Hunter is residing in Edmonton, Alberta with her husband, one son and two large dogs.

Complete list of works

External links
 TinaHunter.ca
 Absolute Xpress
 Chinese Whisperings

References

1985 births
Living people
Canadian bloggers
Canadian science fiction writers
Women science fiction and fantasy writers
Writers from Edmonton